Ponderosa Twins Plus One was an American soul vocal group formed in 1970 in Cleveland, Ohio. The group featured two sets of identical twins, Alfred and Alvin Pelham, and Keith and Kirk Gardner, along with Ricky Spicer. The group released one studio album, 2 + 2 + 1 = Ponderosa Twins Plus One, in 1971, before disbanding in 1975.

The group came into prominence after their track, "Bound" was sampled by rapper Kanye West in his 2013 song, "Bound 2". This was followed by a copyright lawsuit by Ricky Spicer. "Bound" was also sampled by rapper Tyler, the Creator in his 2019 song "A Boy Is a Gun".

History
The group was founded in 1969 while the original members attended the Patrick Henry Jr. High School on the east side of Cleveland. The group was managed by Tony Wilson, who brought them to the attention of Bobby Massey of The O'Jays. Through Massey, the group eventually signed to Chuck Brown's Astroscope record label.

Accompanied by Massey, the group recorded three singles in a studio. Sylvia Robinson, the owner of All Platinum Records, agreed to distribute singles. The group's first single, "You Send Me" became their best-selling single, peaking at number 23 at Billboards Best Selling Soul Singles. Following the success of the single, the group toured with artists such as the Moments, the Whatnauts, Linda Jones and Lonnie Youngblood.

In 1971, the group released their debut album, 2 + 2 + 1 = Ponderosa Twins Plus One. "Bound" became their second single and peaked at number 47 on Best Selling Soul Singles chart. The second single off the album, a cover of Frankie Lymon's "Why Do Fools Fall in Love", was also released in 1971. It was produced by Calvin Simon of Parliament and Funkadelic.

Due to the lack of royalties and earnings from live shows, the group disbanded in 1975. Following the disestablishment of the act, The Pelham Twins have since died  and Kirk Gardner has been incarcerated at Belmont Correctional Institution since 6/9/1980 for receiving stolen property, felony assault, rape, kidnapping and aggravated murder. He is doing 28 years to life. Spicer has also alleged that Keith Gardner is also incarcerated.  Ricky Spicer became a construction worker in the greater Cleveland area and maintained a friendship with Kirk and Keith Gardner.

Lawsuits
In 2013, Ricky Spicer filed a lawsuit against rapper Kanye West, as well as Roc-A-Fella Records, The Island Def Jam Music Group, Rhino Entertainment and Universal Music Group, citing copyright infringement in West's track, "Bound 2", from his 2013 album, Yeezus. Spicer alleged that West didn't ask his permission to use the sample and it was audible in the record, seeking an injunction and damages for alleged violations.
 
In 2014, Spicer sued Vogue magazine and its publisher Condé Nast, after "Bound 2" was used in the promotional behind the scenes video for the magazine's April edition cover, which featured Kanye West and Kim Kardashian.

In 2015, court documents revealed that the lawsuit against Kanye West was settled.  Ricky Spicer's attorney, Brittany Weiner, from the law firm Imbesi Law P.C., released a statement that the parties entered into a confidential settlement agreement.

Discography
Studio albums
 2 + 2 + 1 = Ponderosa Twins Plus One (1971)

Singles
 "You Send Me" (1971)
 "Bound" (1971)
 "Why Do Fools Fall in Love/Bitter with the Sweet" (1971)

References

External links
 

Vocal quintets
African-American musical groups
American soul musical groups
American rhythm and blues musical groups
American funk musical groups
Identical twins
American vocal groups
Musical groups established in 1970
Musical groups disestablished in 1975
Musical groups from Cleveland